NITF may refer to:
 National Imagery Transmission Format
 News Industry Text Format